Tiddington railway station was  on the Wycombe Railway and served the village of Tiddington, Oxfordshire.

On 24 October 1864 the Wycombe Railway opened an extension from Thame to Oxford. The line passed just south of Tiddington, although Tiddington was not provided at first with a station, the station being opened and appearing on timetables for the first time on 1 June 1866. The station building being constructed in timber with a small canopy over part of the platform. A signal box was provided in 1892 but was downgraded to a ground frame by 1907.

On 7 January 1963 British Railways withdrew passenger services between Princes Risborough and Oxford, closed all intermediate stations including Tiddington, and dismantled the track between Thame and Morris Cowley.

References

Disused railway stations in Oxfordshire
Former Great Western Railway stations
Railway stations in Great Britain opened in 1866
Railway stations in Great Britain closed in 1963